Chineasy is an Internet startup created with the purpose of teaching characters, created by the entrepreneur Shaolan Hsueh. For visual learners the human brain is able to memorize information better if it is put into a visual context .  The approach is to learn Chinese characters with the help of illustrations to help memorize Chinese characters better. The 2014 book Chineasy: The New Way to Read Chinese contains about 400 characters.  It was based on her 2013 TED talk and funded via a crowdfunding campaign through Kickstarter.

While the book introduces common Chinese characters, it does not teach pronunciation or grammar, and thus does not teach how to read or use the language, although it does use voice recordings for the users to mimic.

Chineasy’s first app, Chineasy, launched in 2018, makes it fun and easy to learn Chinese words on-the-go through flashcards and quizzes. The app is awarded as Editor’s Choice and has reached number 2 in the UK and number 6 in the US Apple App Store’s education category. It was featured on the new Apple Watch App Store during the keynote address at the 2019 Worldwide Developers Conference in San Jose. The Chineasy app is a 2022 Apple Design Award finalist for Delight & Fun.

Set of characters

Chineasy teaches sometimes traditional and sometimes simplified forms. Hsueh argued that traditional and simplified forms of Chinese still share a great number of characters, and in real life – just as in the case of British English and American English – you will come across both forms. Where they differ, she shows the other version as well. Chineseasy Everyday teaches over 400 of the most used and useful Chinese characters, phrases and sentences. In addition to learning characters the learner will also experience many stories that explain Chinese customs and culture.

Reception

Chineasy has been widely featured in the press, including the Financial Times,  the Wall Street Journal, Time magazine, and National Public Radio. It won Wallpaper’s 2014 Design Award. Hsueh's book uses illustrations and storytelling. Characters are illustrated by various illustrators including Noma Bar.

According to the sinologist and linguist Victor H. Mair “anyone who deceives him/herself into thinking that using Chineasy is a magic bullet for learning Chinese will simply be wasting his/her time.” He wrote:
“First of all, if you employ Ms. Hsueh’s methods, you won’t learn any real Chinese language. You won’t know the sound of a single Chinese word. You won’t even know the sound of a single Chinese character. You won’t learn anything about Chinese grammar or syntax. You won’t be able to speak or write a single Chinese sentence. If you doggedly persist, you might learn to recognize a hundred or so individual characters, but you wouldn’t know how to pronounce them or use them in any meaningful context.
What is worse, you will be subjected to a lot of assertions that are wrong.”

References

Chinese language
British educational websites